The Callitrichidae (also called Arctopitheci or Hapalidae) are a family of New World monkeys, including marmosets, tamarins, and lion tamarins. At times, this group of animals has been regarded as a subfamily, called the Callitrichinae, of the family Cebidae.

This taxon was traditionally thought to be a primitive lineage, from which all the larger-bodied platyrrhines evolved. However, some works argue that callitrichids are actually a dwarfed lineage.

Ancestral stem-callitrichids likely were "normal-sized" ceboids that were dwarfed through evolutionary time. This may exemplify a rare example of insular dwarfing in a mainland context, with the "islands" being formed by biogeographic barriers during arid climatic periods when forest distribution became patchy, and/or by the extensive river networks in the Amazon Basin.

All callitrichids are arboreal. They are the smallest of the simian primates. They eat insects, fruit, and the sap or gum from trees; occasionally, they take small vertebrates. The marmosets rely quite heavily on tree exudates, with some species (e.g. Callithrix jacchus and Cebuella pygmaea) considered obligate exudativores.

Callitrichids typically live in small, territorial groups of about five or six animals. Their social organization is unique among primates, and is called a "cooperative polyandrous group". This communal breeding system involves groups of multiple males and females, but only one female is reproductively active. Females mate with more than one male and each shares the responsibility of carrying the offspring.

They are the only primate group that regularly produces twins, which constitute over 80% of births in species that have been studied. Unlike other male primates, male callitrichids generally provide as much parental care as females. Parental duties may include carrying, protecting, feeding, comforting, and even engaging in play behavior with offspring. In some cases, such as in the cotton-top tamarin (Saguinus oedipus), males, particularly those that are paternal, even show a greater involvement in caregiving than females. The typical social structure seems to constitute a breeding group, with several of their previous offspring living in the group and providing significant help in rearing the young.

Species and subspecies list

Taxa included in the Callitrichidae are:

Family Callitrichidae
 Genus Saguinus
 Subgenus Saguinus
 Red-handed tamarin, Saguinus midas
 Western black tamarin, Saguinus niger
 Eastern black-handed tamarin, Saguinus ursulus
 Pied tamarin, Saguinus bicolor
 Martins's tamarin, Saguinus martinsi
 Saguinus martinsi martinsi
 Saguinus martinsi ochraceus
 White-footed tamarin, Saguinus leucopus
 Cottontop tamarin, Saguinus oedipus
 Geoffroy's tamarin, Saguinus geoffroyi
 Subgenus Tamarinus
 Moustached tamarin, Saguinus mystax
 Spix's moustached tamarin, Saguinus mystax mystax
 Red-capped moustached tamarin, Saguinus mystax pileatus
 White-rump moustached tamarin, Saguinus mystax pluto
 White-lipped tamarin, Saguinus labiatus
 Geoffroy's red-bellied tamarin, Saguinus labiatus labiatus
 Gray's red-bellied tamarin, Saguinus labiatus rufiventer
 Thomas's red-bellied tamarin, Saguinus labiatus thomasi
 Emperor tamarin, Saguinus imperator
 Black-chinned emperor tamarin, Saguinus imperator imperator
 Bearded emperor tamarin, Saguinus imperator subgrisescens
 Mottle-faced tamarin, Saguinus inustus
 Genus Leontocebus
 Black-mantled tamarin, Leontocebus nigricollis
 Spix's black-mantle tamarin, Leontocebus nigricollis nigricollis
 Graells's tamarin, Leontocebus nigricollis graellsi
 Hernández-Camacho's black-mantle tamarin, Leontocebus nigricollis hernandezi
 Brown-mantled tamarin, Leontocebus fuscicollis
 Avila Pires' saddle-back tamarin, Leontocebus fuscicollis avilapiresi
 Spix's saddle-back tamarin, Leontocebus fuscicollis fuscicollis
 Mura's saddleback tamarin, Leontocebus fuscicollis mura
 Lako's saddleback tamarin, Leontocebus fuscicollis primitivus
 Andean saddle-back tamarin, Leontocebus leucogenys
 Lesson's saddle-back tamarin, Leontocebus fuscus
 Cruz Lima's saddle-back tamarin, Leontocebus cruzlimai
 Weddell's saddle-back tamarin, Leontocebus weddelli
 Weddell's tamarin, Leontocebus weddelli weddelli
 Crandall's saddle-back tamarin, Leontocebus weddelli crandalli
 White-mantled tamarin, Leontocebus weddelli melanoleucus
 Golden-mantled tamarin, Leontocebus tripartitus
 Illiger's saddle-back tamarin, Leontocebus illigeri
 Red-mantled saddle-back tamarin, Leontocebus lagonotus
 Geoffroy's saddle-back tamarin, Leontocebus nigrifrons
 Genus Leontopithecus
 Golden lion tamarin, Leontopithecus rosalia
 Golden-headed lion tamarin, Leontopithecus chrysomelas
 Black lion tamarin, Leontopithecus chrysopygus
 Superagui lion tamarin, Leontopithecus caissara
 Genus Patasola
 Patasola magdalenae
 Genus Micodon
 Micodon kiotensis
 Genus Callimico
 Goeldi's marmoset, Callimico goeldii
 Genus Mico
 Silvery marmoset, Mico argentatus
 Roosmalens' dwarf marmoset, Mico humilis
 White marmoset, Mico leucippe
 Black-tailed marmoset, Mico melanurus
 Schneider's marmoset, Mico schneideri
 Hershkovitz's marmoset, Mico intermedia
 Emilia's marmoset, Mico emiliae
 Black-headed marmoset, Mico nigriceps
 Marca's marmoset, Mico marcai
 Santarem marmoset, Mico humeralifer
 Gold-and-white marmoset, Mico chrysoleucos
 Maués marmoset, Mico mauesi
 Sateré marmoset, Mico saterei
 Rio Acarí marmoset, Mico acariensis
 Rondon's marmoset, Mico rondoni
 Munduruku marmoset, Mico munduruku
 Genus Cebuella
 Western pygmy marmoset, Cebuella pygmaea
 Eastern pygmy marmoset, Cebuella niveiventris
 Genus Callithrix
 Common marmoset, Callithrix jacchus
 Black-tufted marmoset, Callithrix penicillata
 Wied's marmoset, Callithrix kuhlii
 White-headed marmoset, Callithrix geoffroyi
 Buffy-tufted marmoset, Callithrix aurita
 Buffy-headed marmoset, Callithrix flaviceps

References

External links

 
Primate families
 
Taxa named by Oldfield Thomas
Taxa described in 1903